John Robert Tavai (born September 23, 1993) is a former professional gridiron football defensive lineman and linebacker. He played college football at Southern California. He was signed by Tennessee Titans as an undrafted free agent in 2015. He has also been a member of the Ottawa Redblacks, BC Lions and Hamilton Tiger-Cats of the Canadian Football League (CFL)

Professional career

Tennessee Titans
After going unselected in the 2015 NFL Draft, Tavai signed with the Tennessee Titans on May 11, 2015. On September 5, he was waived for final roster cuts. On November 11, 2015, he was signed to the practice squad. On December 12, 2015, he was promoted to the active roster. In his first season with the Titans he played in four games and contributed with three defensive tackles, a quarterback sack and forced fumble. On September 2, 2016, he was released by the Titans as part of final roster cuts. He was signed to the practice squad on December 6, 2016.

Ottawa Redblacks
On January 3, 2018, it was announced that Tavai had signed with the Ottawa Redblacks. Over two seasons, he played in 22 regular season games, recording 57 defensive tackles, eight special teams tackles, seven sacks and four forced fumbles.

BC Lions
Upon entering free agency on February 11, 2020, Tavai signed with the BC Lions to a one-year contract. Following the cancelled 2020 season he signed a one-year contract extension on January 12, 2021. In his first season with the Lions Tavai played in nine games and recorded 15 defensive tackles, three special teams tackles, two quarterback sacks and one forced fumble. Following the 2021 season he was not re-signed by the Lions and became a fee agent in February 2022.

Hamilton Tiger-Cats 
On February 9, 2022 Tavai signed with the Hamilton Tiger-Cats. On May 19, 2022 the Ti-Cats placed him on the retired list.

Helvetic Guards 
On December 24, 2022 Tavai signed with the Helvetic Guards of the European League of Football.

Personal life
Tavai is of Samoan descent. His younger brother Jahlani, played football at Hawaii and was drafted by the Detroit Lions in the 2nd round of the 2019 NFL Draft. His other younger brother Justus also plays for Hawaii. His uncle, John Schuster is a former rugby union player who represented New Zealand as a member of the All Blacks.

References

External links
BC Lions bio
USC Trojans bio
Tennessee Titans bio
ESPN.com profile

1993 births
Living people
American football linebackers
American sportspeople of Samoan descent
BC Lions players
Canadian football defensive linemen
Ottawa Redblacks players
Sportspeople from Redondo Beach, California
Tennessee Titans players
USC Trojans football players
Helvetic Guards players
American expatriate players of American football
American expatriate sportspeople in Switzerland